Raipur Government Polytechnic, is a government polytechnic located in Raipur, Bankura, West Bengal, India.

About college
This polytechnic is affiliated to the West Bengal State Council of Technical Education,  and recognized by, New Delhi. This polytechnic offers diploma courses in electrical, mechanical and civil engineering.

Raipur Govt. Polytechnic is situated at Siromonipur, which is three (3 KM) from Raipur Block town and 66 km from Bankura District town. It is situated on the road of Bankura-Jhargram Road via Raipur.

Academics

Admission procedure 
Admission in the first year (regular entry) and second year (lateral entry) to the diploma courses are based on the merit list of JEXPO and VOCLET exam respectively conducted by West Bengal State Council of Technical Education.

Education

Diploma education 
Raipur Government Polytechnic offers Diploma Engineering in the fields of:
 Mechanical engineering
 Civil engineering
 Electrical engineering
Diploma engineering is the most common undergraduate program offered by the institute. It is a three-year based program with six semesters
 The first year (semester 1 and 2) of the curriculum has common courses from various departments.
 From the second year (semester 3 to 6) the students take courses offered by their respective departments.
 At the end of the fifth semester, students undertake industrial training as part of the curriculum.
 In the final year of their studies, most of the students are offered jobs in industries and other organisations through the Training and Placement section of the institute. Some students opt out of this facility in favor of higher studies or by applying to recruiting organisations directly.

Departments

Full Time Diploma Courses: (duration: 3 years)

Faculty

Facilities 
The institution is running in a single campus having one large buildings with 3 blocks and other mini buildings. The main building contains administrative block along with the departments of Civil Engineering, Mechanical Engineering, Electrical Engineering, drawing halls, class rooms, Laboratories & Computer Centres. The institution has many separate workshop building which are fitting shop, machine Shop, turner section, welding shop, carpentry shop .

Cells

Student Welfare Committee
Principal-in-Charge  (Head of the Committee)  
Sri Rajdip Pal, Lecturer in Electrical Engineering (Convener)
Hasmat Mondal, Lecturer in Physics (Member)
Sri Sinchan Roy, Lecturer in Civil Engineering (Member)
Miss Nibedita Chaterjee, Lecturer in Humanities (Member)
Student Representative (Member)

Examination Committee
Principal-in-Charge  (Head of the Committee)  
 Dr. Surajit Dan, Secretary of Academic Council (Coordinator)
 Sri. Rajdip Pal, Lecturer in Electrical Engineering (Member)
 Sri Gourab Sen, Lecturer in Mechanical Engineering (Member)
 Sri Soumya Kar, Laboratory Assistant in Civil Engineering (Member)
 Sri Madhab Kaity, Head Clerk (Member)

Disciplinary Committee
 Principal-in-Charge  (Head of the Committee)  
 Dr. Surajit Dan, Secretary of Academic Council (Member)
 Sri Ranabir Roy, HOD, Department of Electrical Engineering (Member)
 Dr. Debiprasad Mondal. HOD, Department of Science and Humanities (Member)
 Sri Sumanta Kumar Mandal, HOD, Department of Mechanical Engineering (Member)
 Sri Prakash Mondal, HOD, Department of Civil Engineering (Member

Internal Complain Committee
Principal-in-Charge  (Head of the Committee)  
 Sri Prakash Mondal, HOD, Department of Civil Engineering (Member)
 Sri Supriya Mondal, Lecturer in Electrical Engineering (Member)
 Miss Nibedita Chaterjee, Lecturer in Humanities (Member)

Green Campus Committee
Principal-in-Charge  (Head of the Committee)  
 Sk. Habibul Rahaman, Lecturer in Electrical Engineering (Convener)
 Sri Amit Kumar Sen, Lecturer in Physics (Member)
 Sri Shovon De, Laboratory Assistant in Physics (Member)
 Sri Raghunath Bhattacherjee, Workshop Instructor in Machine Shop (Member)
 Sri Biswanath Murmu, Group D Staff (Member)

Training and Placement Cell
Principal-in-Charge (Head of the Committee)  
 Sri Supriya Mondal, Training and Placement Officer, Lecturer in Electrical Engineering (Convener)
 Sri Sk Habibul Rahaman, Lecturer in Electrical Engineering (Member)
 Sri Sinchan Roy, Lecturer in Civil Engineering (Member)
 Sri Subrata Mukhopadhyay,  Lecturer in Mechanical Engineering (Member)
 Sri Madhab Kaity, Head Clerk (Member)
 Sri Biswanath Murmu, Group D Staff (Member)

Anti-Ragging Cell
 Principal-in-Charge (Head of the Committee)                                                                                                  
 BDO or his/her Representative                                               
 IC or his/her Representative                                                                                                                       
 Sri Ranabir Roy, HOD, Department of Electrical Engg.                                                                 
 Dr. Debiprasad Mondal, HOD, Department  of Science and Humanities 
 Sri Sumanta Kumar Mandal, HOD, Department of Mechanical Engg. 
 Sri Prakash Mondal, HOD, Department of Civil Engg. 
 Haidar Ali Sheikh, Convener, Anti-Ragging Squad
 Miss Nibedita Chaterjee, Lecturer in Humanities
 Sri Madhab Kaity, Head Clerk
 Sri Biswanath Murmu, Gr. D Staff
 Representative of Guardians
 Representative of Students

Admission
The intake into Diploma courses is made through the Joint Entrance Examination for Polytechnics conducted each year by West Bengal State Council of Technical & Vocational Education and Skill Development .

See also

References

Universities and colleges in Bankura district
Technical universities and colleges in West Bengal
2016 establishments in West Bengal
Educational institutions established in 2016